Joe Barton (born 1985) is a British screenwriter of film and television, best known for the crime series Giri/Haji and the science-fiction thriller The Lazarus Project.

Early life
Barton was born in London. He studied Film and Television Production at the University of Westminster, and one of his first jobs was as a driver on Cass.

Career
His writing career began in film. He has written films such as The Ritual, My Days of Mercy and IBoy. In 2020, it was announced he had written Encounter, a sci-fi thriller starring Riz Ahmed and Octavia Spencer. Amazon Studios will distribute. He is tapped to write a sequel to Cloverfield.

Barton has also written television, first writing for Beaver Falls. He later wrote for Humans, Our World War and the epic miniseries Troy: Fall of a City. In 2019, BBC Two broadcast Barton's crime thriller Giri/Haji (Japanese: 義理/恥, "Duty/Shame"). The series is set in London and Tokyo, with dialogue in English and Japanese. On December 13, 2020, it was announced Barton would be showrunner on Netflix's Half Bad, based on the trilogy of books by author Sally Green, with Andy Serkis and Jonathan Cavendish as executive producers. The series was later renamed to The Bastard Son & The Devil Himself. In January 2021, it was announced that Barton would be replacing Terence Winter as showrunner on an untitled Gotham City Police Department spinoff series based on The Batman. It was later canceled in March 2022, due to "creative differences".

In November 2022, it was announced that Barton would be adapting the Peter Shaffer play Amadeus into a television series. In February 2023, it was announced Barton would write and executive produce an untitled bounty hunter drama series, to be directed by Michael Bay.

Filmography 

Film

Television

References

External links
 

Living people
21st-century British screenwriters
21st-century British male writers
British television writers
British male screenwriters
British science fiction writers
1985 births